The Asia Pacific Democrat Union (APDU) is an international regional association of member parties, associated to the International Democrat Union. Sri Lankan President Ranil Wickramasinghe is the current chairperson of the Asia Pacific Democrat Union. It aims to promote freedom and free enterprise by considering matters of political organization and policy of interest to member parties.

Members

External links 
APDU at the UDI site

References

International Democrat Union